Lupe del Castillo was a Mexican actress who appeared during the Golden Age of Mexican cinema in supporting roles, usually as a maid or an elderly woman. Her films include Peach Blossom (1945), Rosenda (1948), and Comisario en turno (1949).

Selected filmography
Peach Blossom (1945)
Nocturne of Love (1948)
The Genius  (1948)
La Gota de sangre (1950)
The Doorman (1950)
Crime and Punishment  (1951)
Yes, My Love (1953)
What Can Not Be Forgiven (1953)

References

Bibliography
García Riera, Emilio. Historia documental del cine mexicano: 1945. Ediciones Era, 1969.

External links

Year of birth unknown
Year of death unknown
Mexican film actresses
20th-century Mexican actresses